Spicer may refer to:

People

Places
 Spicer, Minnesota, small city in the United States
 2065 Spicer, an asteroid
 New Spicer Meadow Reservoir
 Spicer's Gap, a mountain pass in Queensland, Australia
 Spicer Islands, group of islands in Nunavut, Canada
 Spicers Peak, mountain in Queensland, Australia

People
 Aylmer Spicer Cameron

Brands and enterprises
 James Spicer & Sons (since 1922 ″Spicers Ltd.″), wholesale paper and stationery manufacturer
 Spicer Universal Joint Manufacturing Company, manufacturer of transmissions and automotive components, which later became Dana Holding Corporation
 Spicer joint, a universal joint created by Clarence W. Spicer

Other uses
 Spicer Baronets
 The Collected Books of Jack Spicer